The 2010–11 VfL Bochum season was the 73rd season in club history.

Review and events
After the season, the club mourned the death of long time club official Ottokar Wüst, who died on 18 June 2011.

Matches

Legend

Friendly matches

2. Bundesliga

Promotion playoff

DFB-Pokal

Squad

Squad and statistics

Squad, appearances and goals scored

Minutes played

Bookings

Transfers

Summer

In:

Out:

Winter

In:

Out:

Sources

External links
 2010–11 VfL Bochum season at Weltfussball.de 
 2010–11 VfL Bochum season at kicker.de 
 2010–11 VfL Bochum season at Fussballdaten.de 

Bochum
VfL Bochum seasons